Luz Noceda is the main protagonist of the Disney Channel animated series The Owl House, created by Dana Terrace. She is voiced by Sarah-Nicole Robles. Luz is confirmed to be bisexual by Terrace, some calling her the "first bisexual lead character" on a Disney Channel show.  In April 2021, the show's creator also revealed that Luz Noceda is neurodivergent.

Luz's character has been compared to Anne Boonchuy from Matt Braly's Amphibia, another Disney Channel animated series, this is mainly due to their similar premise and tone. She has been well-received by both critics and fans of the show, who praised her character and Robles' performance.

Creation 
According to series creator Dana Terrace, Luz is named after her Dominican-American roommate, Luz Batista, a story artist and consultant for the show. Terrace also said that Luz's character evolved from conversations she had with Luz Batista, who later became her best friend. Later, Nancy Kanter, EVP, Content and Creative Strategy of Disney Channels Worldwide explained that while they loved the "combination of magic and mystery in this other world" of The Owl House, they really "fell in love with the main character Luz," leading them to green-light the show itself. This connected with Terrace's hope that audiences are "entertained by Luz’s world and her off-the-wall adventures."

LGBTQ+ representation and impact 
On July 7, 2020, when responding to a fan who posted a still of Amity putting her hands on Luz's shoulder, from a promotion for the upcoming episode "Enchanting Grom Fright" on Twitter, Terrace said that there is no heterosexual explanation for the moment. Later, on August 10, Terrace confirmed on Twitter that the episode features a bisexual character, but didn't confirm whether this was Amity, Luz, or both, but many fans assumed this referred to Luz. On September 2, during a Reddit AMA, Dana Terrace confirmed that Amity is intended to be a lesbian and that Luz is bisexual. She also stated that the relationship between Amity and Luz would be explored in Season 2 and that Luz is "oblivious to some things in front of her," including Amity's crush on her. In the same AMA, Terrace stated that Luz was Amity's first crush and that she was thrilled to see people connect to the show's characters, like Luz and Amity.

Character 

Luz Noceda is a 15-year-old Afro-Dominican-American girl from the fictional town of Gravesfield, Connecticut. She has brown skin, short dark brown hair, brown eyes, and typically wears a cat-ear hooded indigo-and-white t-shirt, denim shorts, black leggings, and white shoes.

Luz is very quirky, outgoing, and unpredictable. She is a fan of the novel series The Good Witch Azura. She loves fantasy to the point of being detached from reality and has a hard time making friends. However, she still does have a heart and good intentions. In the first episode of the series her mother sends her to a reality-check camp, but she accidentally ends up going to the Boiling Isles instead through a portal in a nearby house. Due to her love of all things fantasy and magical, she wants to become a witch. She soon befriends an old witch named Eda and a small wolf-like demon named King. Later, Luz enrolls in Hexside Academy as an exchange student.

Fictional character biography

Season 1

Luz Noceda is a young girl who has a strong love for fantasy. So strong, in fact, that it gets her into trouble. After failing her book report at school due to her outlandish presentation, her mother decides to send her to "Reality Check Summer Camp" to help her focus more on reality. To show confirmation of her mother's wishes, she throws her copy of The Good Witch Azura book in the trash. As soon as her mother leaves, however, she fishes for it, only to see it being carried away, along with other garbage, by a diminutive owl and follows it into a run-down house. Luz suddenly gets transported to the magical world of the Boiling Isles, specifically a town called Bonesborough. Luz is immediately taken in by a notorious witch named Eda Clawthorne and her small "roommate" King and begins to live with them at the Owl House, the series' namesake. Realizing that her life back home would be unfulfilling, she decides to stay in Bonesborough to train under Eda and become a witch, despite the fact that she herself is incapable of performing magic. Shortly afterward, she befriends two young witches named Willow Park and Gus Porter who attend Hexside, a school that Luz begins trying to attend. She also meets Amity Blight, a snooty student who initially looks down on Luz and her friends. During her time in Bonesborough, Luz slowly learns that she can perform magic by drawing symbols(also referred to as glyphs) on paper. Her first symbol, a magic orb that produces light, stuns Eda. In a Coven Convention, Luz challenges Amity to a witch duel, which she accepts, on the condition that if she wins Luz must give up learning magic. Amity is disqualified as she is found to have been unknowingly cheating, and leaves, ridiculed. Luz finds her and comforts her by offering her friendship, and Amity, reluctant at first, allows Luz to continue her magic studies.

She discovers that Eda had been cursed as a child and wants to help her try to remove it. Her relationship with Amity begins to improve when she realizes that Luz genuinely cares for her well-being and end up having a shared love for The Good Witch Azura series. Through the actions of Eda, and a little from Gus, Luz finally gets accepted into Hexside and, contrary to the initial rules, is allowed to learn from every track after she saves the school from a Greater Basilisk. She helps Willow regain her confidence on school, and, by entering her mind, manages to discover the roots of her troubled past with Amity. She helps them both start over again their relationship. On Grom night, Luz offers to fight Grometheus, a monster that manifests as the fighter's deepest fears, instead of Amity, who was originally chosen. When she is overpowered, Amity comes to her for help. They dance together while casting multiple magic spells, defeating Grometheus. Despite having increased confidence and security about herself, Willow keeps getting bullied by Boscha and her friends, to which Luz, Gus, and Amity decide to help. They challenge Boscha to a Grudgby match, in which, while they lose, they gain the respect and sympathy of Boscha's teammates. Luz cares for Amity, as she suffered a leg injury during the match.

Luz attends a field trip to the Emperor's Coven and plans to steal an item to cure Eda. She ends up getting discovered by Lilith, Eda's sister, who has been trying to capture her, and kidnaps Luz to lure Eda out. They collectively learn that Lilith had been the one who cursed Eda and has been trying to capture her, not just to cure Eda's curse, but to also have her join the coven, something Eda had long detested. Luz ends up getting sent back home after Eda gives herself up willingly to save her. Luz and King head back to rescue her from the Emperor's Coven and reluctantly teams up with Lilith after she admits that Emperor Belos plans to kill Eda, rather than cure her. Luz faces off against the Emperor who will only let Eda go if she gives him the key to the real world, which Eda used when Luz first came to the Boiling Isles. However, Luz uses her magic to destroy it and she rescues her friends before fleeing. Lilith uses her magic to share the curse between herself and Eda, and Luz decides to help them reclaim their magic after theirs diminish.

Season 2

Luz, now more adept and skilled with her glyph magic, decides to teach it to Eda and Lilith, to cope with their newfound weakness due to their curse. Eda, sensing Luz's guilt for recent events, tells her that her life has been better with her in it. Luz and Amity's relationship continues to improve, after the latter saved Luz from her parents, as she was trying to get her expelled friends back into Hexside. Luz learns from Eda's mother that she was not the first human on the Boiling Isles. In the library, she learns that Philip Wittebane managed to arrive to the Isles hundreds of years ago. She seeks Philip's diary, which can only be accessed with Amity's help. Their relationship improves further, with Amity expressing interest in visiting the Human Realm. After Luz made Amity lose her library card, Amity kisses her on the cheek after she helped her regain the card back. With Philip's diary and a knowledge-replaying Echo Mouse, Luz begin's studying Philip's notes. Luz can't create a connection with any of the Palismen, as she is skeptical about her future. She decides to spend the night in the Palismen nest, hoping to bond with one. After rescuing the Palismen from the Coven guard, and befriending Hunter, the Emperor's Guard, she is given a log of palistrom wood by Eda to carve her own palisman staff. After what happened at Amity's house, Luz is now more confident of her feelings. Hooty tries to help, placing both of them in a tunnel of love. As they traverse the river, Luz feels embarrassed at the tunnel's romantic messages, destroying them to prevent Amity from seeing them. However, Amity mistakenly believes Luz is uninterested in her and turns to leave, heartbroken. Hooty, upset, lashes out, wreaking havoc in the House, but King and Eda allow Luz and Amity to ask each other out, and begin dating. Luz continues to study the contents of the Echo Mouse with the help of Amity.

Luz discovers from the Echo Mouse that Titan's Blood is needed to create a temporary portal home, which can be found on Eclipse Lake. Eda and King offer to get it for her, and Amity tags along, wanting to prove she is a good girlfriend for Luz. Luz worries for their well-being, and she joyfully embraces Amity when they return, happy that she is safe. With the Blood recovered, Eda and King create a temporary portal for Luz to check on her mother, Camila. She discovers that a shape-shifting Basilisk, named Vee, has been living her life back in the Human Realm. Luz learns that Vee escaped the Boiling Isles, as her species was being experimented upon by the Emperor's Coven. With the help of Camila, Luz rescues Vee from a demon-crazed curator. Luz reveals that staying in the Boiling Isles was her own choice, but promises Camila to stay in the Human Realm once she manages another way to come back, leaving Camila devastated.

After collaborating with Amity in assisting and later defeating Kikimora with her own personal business, Amity shows Luz her phone, which she left behind at school, playing a video Luz recorded for Camila. Luz finally explains her situation to her mother, and they promise to maintain themselves together throughout the journey. Luz resolves to meet with Philip personally, after learning from Eda that time-traveling puddles exist. With the help of Lilith, they travel to Philip's era through a puddle. However, they end up having to defeat Philip after he betrays them, leaving Luz guilty of having been blinded by her admiration for him. Luz agrees to help Amity in a competition, but Amity notices Luz is acting differently. Luz reveals to Amity that her father died a long time ago, and on his death anniversary, she spends the day with her mother. However, she will be unable to accompany Camila this year. They send flowers tied to a balloon into the night sky, in the hopes that they will reach the Human Realm. Luz and Hunter end up trapped inside Belos' mind. There, Luz discovers not just the whole truth about Belos, but also discovering his true identity as Philip Wittebane. After being saved by Eda and King, she is left shaken at what she has discovered. Luz tells Eda, Hooty, and King about the things she saw on Belos' mind, but does not mention his real name or reveal her actions. Luz, King, and Hooty travel to a village inhabited by beings similar to King, who call themselves the Titan Trappers. Luz and Hooty learn from talking with the elder of the village, Bill, that King is actually the son of the original Titan. Bill orders the village to sacrifice him, but Luz and Hooty save him, destroying the entrance portal as they escape.

After telling Lilith and Eda the truth about King's heritage, Luz strains her relationship with the latter when she expresses her desire to send her and King away to protect them. She confronts Eda, accusing her of underestimating her power, and they end up captured by the Coven guard. However, they are instead taken to a hideout, where Darius, Raine, and other Coven rebels express their desire to enlist their help to stop Belos' plan. The Covens Against the Throne explain to Luz their plan to stop Belos, but Luz expresses her desire to rescue Amity first, as she has been grounded by Odalia. With the help of Gus, Willow, and Hunter, she finally reunites with Amity, who leaps towards Luz, embracing her with teary eyes. Amity kisses her for the very first time, and they promise to go on a proper date when they've succeeded. Luz tries to help Amity bring sense to her parents, as they believe they are oblivious to the evil they are assisting. After destroying the Blight factory with the help of Alador, Gus reveals that Luz has been captured by Kikimora, as she assumed Hunter's appearance. As such, a captured Luz is taken to face Belos personally once again. After the draining spell begins taking effect, she duels with him, as he expresses his desire to save her from the "delusions" caused by the Demon Realm, and tries to send her back to the portal. However, she saves herself from being petrified and manages to brand him with a sigil, causing Philip to be affected by the spell. After he presumably gets killed by the freed Collector, Luz and her friends are all through the portal to the Human Realm by King in an attempt to save them. After it collapses and the magical door only leads to the old shack, Luz goes home and reunites with Camila, devastated for the fate that awaits her family in the Demon Realm.

Season 3
Luz and her friends live with Camila for several months, during which Luz returns to school, and her friends stay home and attempt to learn how to live in the Human Realm, going as far as to try to understand Spanish. However, Luz feels guilty for her friends' predicaments, and despite her denying it, she is constantly down. Before the Gravesfield Halloween Festival, Luz records a mournful video on her laptop, exclaiming she has decided to stay in the Human Realm permanently to protect her friends. Sometime later, Luz and Hunter spot Belos in the woods on Halloween night. Belos ultimately creates a new portal in a cemetery with Titan's Blood he found using a map he stole while possessing Hunter's body. Their friends and Camila arrive to help, and Hunter expels Belos from his body after the battle. Belos crosses the portal, but Hunter is left mortally wounded. Flapjack, his palisman, sacrifices himself to save Hunter's life, deepening Luz's grief. After the fight, Luz finally confesses that the Day of Unity and everything that has happened to them is her fault, as it was she who introduced Philip Wittebane to magic when she traveled back in time. However, her friends reiterate their support, and Amity assures her she won't leave her side. After Camila arms herself, much to her surprise, both she and Luz cross the portal.

Reception  
Luz's character was received positively. She was described by some as a teen who "aligns herself with a witch and a demon" to fulfill her dream to become a witch, and praised her character, with some calling her a "fantasy-loving human." Others praised the plotlines of episodes where Luz explored the magic school and met other witches of the same age, and the growing romantic relationship between Luz and Amity.

In the season 1 episode "Enchanting Grom Fright," Luz and Amity dance together for the first time. Spencer Wan says that he's "never been prouder of any other board." Alex Hirsch (voice of King and Hooty, creator of Gravity Falls, and Terrace's partner) was very proud of Disney for including this scene in an episode. After it was confirmed that Luz was bisexual, actress Lili Reinhart, who plays Grace in Chemical Hearts, welcomed the development, saying that often people have told her that being bisexual is "a phase," and felt validated by Luz's character.

Other media 

She would later appear in Chibi form in the animated series based on the "Chibi Tiny Tales" shorts, Chibiverse.

See also 
 List of The Owl House characters

References 

The Owl House
Animated characters
Animated human characters
Disney Television Animation characters
Child characters in animated television series
Female characters in animated series
LGBT characters in animated television series
Neurodivergent characters in animated series
Fictional bisexual females
Fictional characters from Connecticut
Fictional characters who use magic
Fictional characters with fire or heat abilities
Fictional characters with ice or cold abilities
Fictional characters with plant abilities
Fictional characters with earth or stone abilities
Fictional characters who can turn invisible
Fictional Afro-Dominican people
Fictional Dominican American people
Teenage characters in television
Television characters introduced in 2020
Fictional characters with attention deficit hyperactivity disorder
Fictional revolutionaries
Fictional inventors
Fictional characters with disfigurements
Fictional characters displaced in other dimensions